Banagram Union is a union parishad under Morrelganj Upazila of Bagerhat District in the division of Khulna, Bangladesh. It has an area of 45.48 km2 (17.56 sq mi) and a population of 14,539.

Villages
 Baharboula
 Banagram
 Sripur
 Daskhali
 Bishkhali
 Kandarpur
 Kathipara
 Balbhadrapur
 Abeta
 Mohanpur
 Choto Karaboula
 Putia
 Jhantipur
 Karaboula
 Jaipur

References

Unions of Morrelganj Upazila
Unions of Bagerhat District
Unions of Khulna Division